Lola Akinmade Åkerström is a Nigerian photographer and travel writer based in Stockholm, Sweden. She is the editor-in-chief for Slow Travel Stockholm. Her works have been featured in the National Geographic Traveler, BBC, and CNN, among other publications. She studied Geography Information System (GIS) at the University of Maryland.

Early life and education 
She started her early life in Lagos south west Nigeria, where she completed her early school life before relocating to the United States at the age of 15. She received a master's degree in Information System from the University of Maryland. At the age of 19, she gained admission to the University of Oxford in the England but failed to pursue it because of funding. In 2006, Åkerström relocated to Sweden with her husband.

Career
Åkerström started her career as a field journalist at Eco-Challenge. She worked for 12 years as a GIS developer before becoming a professional photographer. Between 2006 and 2007, she joined Matador Network and worked as an editor. In October 2009 she resigned her appointment at the GIS world to pursue her passion. In June 2011, Åkerström contested in a pre-selection program organised by Quark Expeditions to pick a writer that will be traveling to the North Pole for the project of documenting its ecosystem. In 2012 she participated in the expedition race in Fiji, where she started the combination of her traveling, photography and writing skills. In 2016, she went to Italy to attend the Unesco World Heritage Sites of Sabbioneta and Mantua for exploration.

Awards

References

External links

Living people
Nigerian photographers
Nigerian women photographers
Yoruba photographers
University of Maryland, College Park alumni
Nigerian expatriates in Sweden
Yoruba women writers
Nigerian women writers
Nigerian expatriates in the United States
Nigerian editors
Nigerian travel writers
Year of birth missing (living people)